Lucy Ford: The Atmosphere EP's is a compilation album by the Minneapolis hip hop group Atmosphere. It was released on Rhymesayers Entertainment in 2001. The album collects the previously released EP's, Ford One, Ford Two, and The Lucy EP.

Reception

Stanton Swihart of AllMusic gave the album 4 stars out of 5, commenting that "its stronger moments are among the most forward-thinking hip-hop ever made." Nathan Rabin of The A.V. Club wrote, "The beer-soaked ennui of the hip-hop depressive hasn't been captured this evocatively since before Basehead found Jesus".

In 2015, it was ranked at number 14 on Facts "100 Best Indie Hip-Hop Records of All Time" list.

Track listing

References

External links
 

2001 compilation albums
Atmosphere (music group) albums
Rhymesayers Entertainment compilation albums